Zambales may refer to:
 Zambales Province
 Zambales Mountains
 Sambal people